Teachers TV  was a UK government–funded website and former free-to-air distance education television channel which operated from 2005–2011. The website provided video and support materials for those who work in education, including teachers, school leaders, governors, teacher trainers, student teachers and support staff.

Its original aims included raising educational standards, saving the workforce time, and boosting professional development. All content was available to watch or download for free.

The service was launched on 8 February 2005. During its operations, it was managed by Education Digital Management Ltd, and funded by the Department for Children, Schools and Families (DCSF). The website was co-owned by Ten Alps (75%) and ITN (25%). In October 2010, Ten Alps announced that the Department for Education was cancelling the £10m annual Teachers TV contract for 2011.

As of April 2018, all content produced by Teachers TV remains freely available at the TES website.

Programming

General programming included a weekly half-hour news programme, documentaries on the educational issues and controversies of the day, and guidance on topics such as behaviour management.

It covered all National Curriculum subjects, as well as specialist programmes for headteachers, managers, newly qualified teachers (NQT), teaching assistants (TA), and governors. It also had an educational news service supplied by ITN.

Charter

While it was funded by the DCSF, Teachers TV was editorially independent of government. This was a requirement of the Communications Act 2003 and Ofcom, the regulator for the UK communications industries. To ensure accountability for its funding, a governance process was established, managed by the Teachers TV Board of Governors.

Operations

Teachers TV (TTV) was a government-funded, advertisement-aided programme for teachers. It was initially an online TV channel, then just a web vehicle for specific professional training — Continuous Professional Development, or CPD, mainly via video experiences across all curricula, age groups and other school based issues, specifically aimed at teachers. It was run by a highly professional group of individuals, at extremely high costs, managed by Ten Alps.

2011 saw the launch of Teaching Channel, a US initiative to deliver professional development videos for teachers over the Internet, public television, cable and other digital outlets.

Decline and closure

In March 2010, Ed Balls, then Secretary of State for Children, Schools and Families (DCSF) axed the broadcast deals in place with Freeview, Freesat, Sky and Virgin Media in a bid to save the channel around £1m in carriage costs annually. It closed on Freeview first on 21 July, and Freesat, Sky and Virgin followed on 31 August 2010. Online availability was unaffected by the change.

On 15 October 2010, Ten Alps announced that the Department for Education was cancelling the £10m annual Teachers TV contract from April 2011. The contract was due to run until 2013, but the government invoked a six-month break clause. The service had 400,000 registered users. It provided 783,000 training day sessions online in 2009 and claimed to have saved schools an estimated £235m.

In 2011 a number of providers gained a licence from the Department for Education to distribute the Teachers TV videos. Only those videos which were commissioned by the Teachers TV service are available under the terms of the licence.

Reception

Deemed 'successful', Teachers TV gained a wide audience of teachers, heads, assistants and governors, with over 3,500 best practice videos and further raw material for up to 6,000 with investment into new content regularly. Government funding was withdrawn April 2011, and Teachers TV ceased to exist, but all the content was made available for those organisations that would be able to provide free access to all the material for teachers nationally in the UK.

Popular videos included those by behaviour experts John Bayley, Sue Cowley and The Scary Guy, as well as teachers and other school workers who showed hands-on examples of good practice.

As of April 2018, 107 entries from the Teachers TV back catalogue are flagged as "recommended by TES" in the active TES archive.

References

External links
Teachers TV videos available on Teachers Media created by the team behind Teachers TV
Teachers TV videos and resources available at SchoolsWorld
Teachers TV videos (as well as National Strategies and other archived government content) available at Teachfind
Teachers TV videos available on TES
DCSF page
Teachers' channel takes to air - BBC News

Television channels in the United Kingdom
Television channels and stations established in 2005
Educational and instructional television channels
Teaching
Educational broadcasting in the United Kingdom
Television channels and stations disestablished in 2010
Defunct television channels in the United Kingdom